Rainforest of the Austrians is an environment protection project was founded by Michael Schnitzler, an Austrian violinist and grandson of the poet Arthur Schnitzler, as a non-profit organization.
Its goal is raising funds to buy properties in the Esquinas Rainforest which is 146.7 square kilometres big and located in the south of Costa Rica. These properties become part of the Piedras Blancas National Park. This area of the rainforest was owned by local farmers. 

In 1991 the government of Costa Rica has declared the area as a National Park to protect the forest against the clearing. But there has not been enough money for buying the whole forest and 
the government has needed foreign help for realizing their environmental protection plan.

At the end of 2005 33.7 square kilometres were bought. These area got the symbolical name 'Rainforest of the Austrians' (ger. Regenwald der Österreicher). As a result of further protection initiatives there are now 90.3 square kilometres (65% of the Esquinas-rainforest) part of the National Park. 55.8 square kilometres are privately owned, but they are planned to be integrated to the National Park as well.

In the year 2000 the organization Rainforest of the Austrians was honoured with the prestigious 'Binding Environmental Prize' in Liechtenstein. The Naturhistorisches Museum displayed a special exhibition of the project. The ORF showed a documentation about it in the television program 'Universum'.

See also 
 Piedras Blancas National Park

External links 
 Rainforest of the Austrians homepage
 Piedras Blancas National Park at Costa Rica National Parks
 Overview of the park from Moon Handbooks

Environmental organisations based in Austria